The Yaw dialect of Burmese is spoken by 20,000 people near the Chin Hills in Magway Division, particularly in Gangaw District, which comprises Saw, Htilin, and Gangaw. Yaw was classified as a "definitely endangered" language in UNESCO's 2010 Atlas of the World’s Languages in Danger.

The Yaw dialect is very similar to standard Burmese except for the following rhyme changes:

References

Burmese language